Periya Thambi is a 1997 Indian Tamil-language drama film directed and co-produced by Chitra Lakshmanan. The film stars Prabhu and Nagma. It was released on 14 January 1997.

Plot

Siva (Prabhu) lives with his father Soundarapandian (Thalaivasal Vijay), a police officer, and his little sister Geetha in the city. Geetha gets engaged and Siva notes that his father will not invite his family to the wedding. Hence, Siva finds out the village of his family and decides to go there. At his father's village, Siva is insulted by his uncle Sankarapandian (Vijayakumar), while his aunt Kamachi (Vadivukkarasi) welcomes him. Soon, Kamachi's daughter Selvi (Nagma) and Siva fall in love with each other. How Siva reconciles his uncle and marries Selvi forms the rest of the story.

Cast

Prabhu as Siva
Nagma as Selvi
Goundamani as Azhagu Sundaram
Vijayakumar as Sankarapandian
Chandrasekhar as Muthu
Thalaivasal Vijay as Sundarapandian, Siva's father
Uday Prakash as Thangarasu
Ponvannan as Rathnam
Vadivukkarasi as Kamachi, Selvi's mother
Sangeeta as Sivagami
R. V. Aswini as Meena, Sankarapandian's daughter
Suvarna Mathew as Kannamma
Chitra Lakshmanan
K. K. Soundar as Muthu's father
Kullamani
Periya Karuppu Thevar
Jaya Mani
Mahanadi Dinesh

Soundtrack

The film score and the soundtrack were composed by Deva. The soundtrack, released in 1997, features 5 tracks with lyrics written by Vairamuthu.

Reception
R. P. R. of Kalki praised the first half as natural but criticized the second half as cliched and routine.

References

1997 films
Films scored by Deva (composer)
1990s Tamil-language films
Indian drama films